Sir Edmund Bowyer (12 May 1552 – 18 February 1627) was an English lawyer, landowner and politician who sat in the House of Commons at various times between 1593 and 1624.

Early life 
Bowyer was the eldest son of John Bowyer of Camberwell and his second wife, Elizabeth Draper, daughter of Robert Draper, gentleman, of Camberwell, Surrey, Page of the Jewels to King Henry VIII. He was admitted at Lincoln's Inn in 1569 and succeeded to the estates of his father in about 1570. He was called to the bar in 1577.  From 1582 he was J.P. for Surrey and in 1583, Bowyer added to his Surreyestate by buying one-fifth of the manor of Camberwell Buckingham.

Career 
In 1593, Bowyer was elected Member of Parliament for Morpeth. He was elected MP for Southwark in 1597. From 1600 to 1601 he was  High Sheriff of Surrey and Sussex.  He was knighted in 1603. In 1604 he was elected MP for Surrey. He was Deputy Lieutenant of Surrey by 1614 when he was re-elected MP for Surrey. He was one of the  governors of the free grammar school at Camberwell, which was founded under letters patent granted in September 1615. In September 1616 he attended the consecration of Dulwich College after selling land to the founder. In 1624 he was elected MP for Gatton.

Death 
Bowyer died at the age of 74.

Personal life 
Bowyer married Katherine Bynd, daughter of William Bynd of Washington, Sussex in 1573. Bowyer left his estates in Camberwell to his nephew Edmund who was later MP for Gatton.

References

External links
Will of Robert Draper, gentleman, of Camberwell, Surrey, National Archives Retrieved 29 March 2013
Will of Matthew Draper, gentleman, of Camberwell, Surrey, National Archives Retrieved 29 March 2013
'Elizabeth Draper (d. 27 April 1605)', A Who’s Who of Tudor Women: D Retrieved 29 March 2013
Will of Sir Edmund Bowyer of Camberwell, Surrey, National Archives Retrieved 29 March 2013

 

 

1552 births
1627 deaths
Members of Lincoln's Inn
English MPs 1593
English MPs 1597–1598
English MPs 1604–1611
English MPs 1614
English MPs 1624–1625
High Sheriffs of Surrey
High Sheriffs of Sussex